Hans Rouc (1893–1963) was an Austrian art director.

Selected filmography
 The Marquis of Bolibar (1922)
 The Dead Wedding Guest (1922)
 Children of the Revolution (1923)
 The Hands of Orlac (1924)
 The Revenge of the Pharaohs (1925)
 The Priest from Kirchfeld (1926)
 The Right to Live (1927)

References

Bibliography
 William B. Parrill. European Silent Films on Video: A Critical Guide. McFarland, 2006.

External links

1893 births
1963 deaths
Austrian art directors
Film people from Vienna